Esperanza Rising is a young adult historical fiction novel written by Mexican-American author Pam Muñoz Ryan and released by Scholastic Publishing on 27 March 2000.  The novel focuses on Esperanza, the only daughter of wealthy Mexican parents, and follows the events that occur after her father's murder. Esperanza, her mother, and their former household servants flee to California with no money during the Great Depression, where they find agricultural work that pays very little. The book received generally positive reviews from critics, who praised Muñoz Ryan's writing and concluded that it was suitable for classroom discussion.

Plot synopsis 
Esperanza Ortega, the daughter of wealthy landowners, lives in Aguascalientes, Mexico, in 1930 on her family's ranch with her mother, father, and grandmother.

The day before Esperanza's 13th birthday, her father is murdered while working on the ranch. At her birthday party, she receives a doll from papa. It was her last gift from him. Her uncle Luis reveals that he now owns their land. He offers to continue to care for them and their ranch if Esperanza's mother, Ramona, will marry him. When she refuses, he burns down the ranch. Esperanza's grandmother, Abuelita, is injured during the fire and is sent to a convent where she can recover. Esperanza and the rest of her family decide to travel to the United States.

When Esperanza's family arrives in the United States, which is currently in the grip of the Great Depression, they settle in a farm camp in Arvin, California. Esperanza begins to adjust to her new life, but still fantasizes about Abuelita rescuing her from poverty.

Ramona contracts Valley fever, and the doctors are unsure if she will survive. Esperanza, desperate for money to support herself and pay her mother's medical bills, takes work on the farm camp despite being underage. She stockpiles money orders in the hopes of one day sending them to Abuelita and allowing her to travel to the United States.

Tensions rise in the camp as migrants from Oklahoma flee the Dust Bowl and look for work in California. Some workers go on strike to try to improve working conditions. Following a massive demonstration by the strikers, the farm owners call immigration officials to round up and deport the demonstrators. However, many of the people deported were natural-born American citizens who had never been to Mexico. Esperanza has a breakdown and then an argument with her friend, Miguel, because of this event. The next day, they find that Miguel has left to seek work in Northern California.

When Ramona recovers from her illness, Esperanza proudly goes to show her mother the money orders she saved, only to discover that they are missing; Miguel took them when he left. However, Miguel used them to secretly travel to Mexico and retrieve Abuelita.

The book ends on the day of Esperanza's 14th birthday, and Esperanza has finally learned to be grateful for what she has: her family reunited, friends who love her, and most of all: hope.

Main characters 

 Esperanza Ortega: The protagonist, the 13 year old daughter of wealthy Mexican landowners, who spends most of the novel living in poverty in California
 Ramona Ortega: Esperanza's mother
 Sixto Ortega: Esperanza's father
 Abuelita: Esperanza's grandmother
 Tio Luis: Esperanza's uncle who tries to marry Ramona after Sixto's death
 Hortensia: The Ortega family's maid
 Alfonso: Hortensia's husband
 Miguel: Hortensia's son and Esperanza's friend and agemate
 Pepe and Lupe: Alfonso's family members who Esperanza meets after moving to California
 Isabel: Esperanza’s friend

Background information

American laborers from Oklahoma were often hostile toward the Mexican workers because they felt they were taking away their jobs. Mexican migrant laborers would work for much lower pay, so there was much tension between the migrant workers on the fields. Some felt that their conditions were unlivable, so they began to protest for better working conditions. Still, others refused to join the protest in fear that they would be fired. In the 1920s and 1930s (about the time the story takes place) California remained about 86% white. Most of these people were those who owned the land, while the 36,800 workers, many of whom were Mexicans, did not.

Critical reception

Along with its Best Books citation, Publishers Weekly gave Esperanza Rising a starred review, citing its "lyrical, fairy-tale-like style". It praised the way "Ryan poetically conveys Esperanza's ties to the land by crafting her story to the rhythms of the seasons" and the fact that "Ryan fluidly juxtaposes world events... with one family's will to survive". Kirkus Reviews disliked the "epic tone, characters that develop little and predictably, and... romantic patina". However it also found that the "style is engaging, her characters appealing", ultimately saying that the story "bears telling to a wider audience".

Children's Literature praised Esperanza Rising and suggested that it "would be a great choice for a multicultural collection".  Esperanza Rising coincides with other works of its kind to portraying themes of the United States' simultaneous discrimination against and economic reliance on immigrants. According to literary scholar Dr. Rachelle Kuehl, historical fiction like Esparanza Rising serves to connect readers with the past and present, facilitating a co-construction of current and historical Mexican-American experiences. She notes that the novel allows students to confront the realities of discrimination due to skin tone and immigration status, and she praises the book for its cultural authenticity.

The book has been incorporated into school curriculum in literature, social studies, and Spanish.  When the book was used with English as a Second Language students in an Earphone English group at Berkeley High School, they found that Esperanza Rising doesn't just appeal to students who, like Esperanza, have emigrated from Mexico, but "also to those who have moved here after losing their fathers to violence in the former Yugoslavia".

Awards
 The 2001 Jane Addams Children's Book Award
 The 2001 WILLA Literary Award for Children's/Young Adult Fiction
 The 2001 Judy Lopez Memorial Award for Children's Literature
 The 2001 Judy Goddard/Libraries Ltd. Young Adult Book Award
 The 2002 Pura Belpré Award

References

2000 American novels
Novels by Pam Muñoz Ryan
Hispanic and Latino American novels
Great Depression novels
Novels set in Mexico
Novels set in California
Aguascalientes
Scholastic Corporation books
2000 children's books
Children's historical novels
Literature by Hispanic and Latino American women